Thomas O'Halloran (9 March 1892 – 3 January 1970) was an Australian rules footballer who played with South Melbourne in the VFL.

Williamstown recruit Tom O'Halloran was primarily a ruckman but was used in various other positions. He was a centre half-forward in South Melbourne's 1918 premiership side and a three time Victorian interstate representative.

References

External links

Tom O'Halloran's playing statistics from The VFA Project

1892 births
1970 deaths
Australian rules footballers from Melbourne
Sydney Swans players
Sydney Swans Premiership players
Williamstown Football Club players
Prahran Football Club players
One-time VFL/AFL Premiership players
People from Williamstown, Victoria